MOOV HD was an ambient HDTV channel launched by Voom HD Networks in November, 2003. It was available on the Voom DBS (direct broadcast satellite) service. Most of the Voom channels were conventional offerings, but one slot was reserved for an experimental channel called MOOV HD. The channel was produced by Concrete Pictures, a design and production house in Philadelphia founded by Jeff Boortz. The intent was to produce video art for public consumption.

On January 1, 2004, the company that owned the MOOV HD channel slot launched a new channel, LAB HD. MOOV HD remained as a prominent programming strand within Lab HD, and it was joined by new programming initiatives such as Tank TV, Micro and the Robert Wilson Video Portraits.

Defunct television networks in the United States
HD-only channels
Television channels and stations established in 2003
2003 establishments in the United States
Television channels and stations disestablished in 2004
2004 disestablishments in the United States